Flora Vista is a census-designated place (CDP) in San Juan County, New Mexico, United States. The population was 1,383 at the 2000 census. It is part of the Farmington Metropolitan Statistical Area. Flora Vista was founded in 1877 by settlers from Colorado who built cabins along the Animas River. A post office was established the following year. The name derived from the view of wildflowers in the valley.

Geography

Demographics

As of the census of 2000, there were 1,383 people, 504 households, and 406 families residing in the CDP. The population density was 679.8 people per square mile (263.0/km2). There were 537 housing units at an average density of 264.0 per square mile (102.1/km2). The racial makeup of the CDP was 87.13% White, 0.29% African American, 3.33% Native American, 0.14% Asian, 5.21% from other races, and 3.90% from two or more races. Hispanic or Latino of any race were 17.79% of the population.

There were 504 households, out of which 33.5% had children under the age of 18 living with them, 68.3% were married couples living together, 8.3% had a female householder with no husband present, and 19.4% were non-families. 15.1% of all households were made up of individuals, and 5.4% had someone living alone who was 65 years of age or older. The average household size was 2.74 and the average family size was 3.03.

In the CDP the population was spread out, with 26.4% under the age of 18, 7.8% from 18 to 24, 23.7% from 25 to 44, 28.6% from 45 to 64, and 13.4% who were 65 years of age or older. The median age was 40 years. For every 100 females there were 102.2 males. For every 100 females age 18 and over, there were 102.0 males.

The median income for a household in the CDP was $46,157, and the median income for a family was $46,071. Males had a median income of $40,481 versus $20,125 for females. The per capita income for the CDP was $20,189. About 8.1% of families and 12.1% of the population were below the poverty line, including 14.6% of those under age 18 and 9.8% of those age 65 or over.

Education
Flora Vista is served by two public school districts – Aztec and Farmington. Aztec High School is the local high school of the former.

See also

 List of census-designated places in New Mexico

References

External links

Census-designated places in San Juan County, New Mexico
Census-designated places in New Mexico